Hederman is an Irish surname. Notable people with the surname include:

Anthony J. Hederman (1921–2014), Irish judge
Carmencita Hederman (born 1939), Irish politician
Miriam Hederman O'Brien (born 1932 or 1933), Irish barrister and academic
Mark Patrick Hederman, Irish Benedictine monk and writer